Diodora digueti is a species of sea snail, a marine gastropod mollusk in the family Fissurellidae, the keyhole limpets and slit limpets.

Description
The size of the shell reaches 25 mm.

Distribution
This species occurs in the Pacific Ocean from Baja California, Mexico to Ecuador

References

External links
 To Biodiversity Heritage Library (2 publications)
 To World Register of Marine Species
 Gastropods.com: Diodora digueti

Fissurellidae
Gastropods described in 1895